Ōmiya Street (大宮通 おおみやどおり Ōmiya dōri) is a major street running from north to south in the city of Kyoto, Japan. It extends about 10 km from Shikanoshimo Park in the north to Takeda Idebashi Street in the south, crossing the Kita-ku, Nakagyō-ku, Shimogyō-ku, Minami-ku and Fushimi-ku districts of Kyoto.

History 
Modern day Ōmiya Street corresponds to the Higashi Ōmiya Ōji of the Heian-kyō. After the decline of the Heian-kyō, as many other roads of the time it was extensively reduced, however it still remained by the time of the Kamakura period and beyond.  Due to the construction of the Nijō Castle, the street was divided in two, in the section between Takeyamachi and Oshikoj streets.

Present Day 
Nowadays Ōmiya Street is located between Horikawa Street (east) and Mibugawa Street (west). The section south of Shijō Street is currently a wide highway, however the norther part is a narrow local street, with many sections being one-way only. The section between Kamidachiuri and Motoseiganji streets crosses the hearth of the Nishijin district.

Relevant Landmarks Along the Street 

 Nishijin
 Nijō Castle
 Shinsenen
 Ōmiya Station (Hankyu Kyoto Line)
 Shijō-Ōmiya Station (Randen)
 Nishi Hongan-ji
 Ryukoku University
 Umekoji Park
 Tō-ji

External links 

 Nijō Castle
 Nishi Hongan-ji
 Ryukoku University

References 

Streets in Kyoto
Odonyms referring to a building